The ABCD Basketball Camp was a youth basketball camp founded by Sonny Vaccaro that was held from 1984 to 2006. The camp gathered the highest ranked high school players of the United States, and was considered one of the top events of high school basketball. ABCD stood for Academic Betterment and Career Development.

History 
The ABCD Camp was founded in 1984 by Sonny Vaccaro and was sponsored by Nike. The camp took place every year in the month of July usually lasting 4–5 days, and was held in different locations in the initial years, among which the Bren Events Center at UC Irvine in 1992 and at Eastern Michigan University in Ypsilanti, Michigan in 1993 before moving to the Rothman Center, at Fairleigh Dickinson University in Hackensack, New Jersey, where the camp was held from 1994 until its final edition in 2006.

The camp was sponsored by the corporations Vaccaro was signed to: from 1984 to 1992 Nike was the sponsor; in 1993 the camp was under the Converse brand, while from 1994 to 2003 Adidas was the sponsor. After 2003, Vaccaro had a deal with Reebok that lasted until the last edition of the camp in 2006. Several college coaches attended ABCD Camp during their recruitment process of high school players: among them Bob Bender, Jim Boeheim, P. J. Carlesimo, Joe Harrington and Mike Krzyzewski. NBA scouts also participated and in some cases, camp participants were drafted out of high school, for instance Kevin Garnett, Kobe Bryant, Jermaine O'Neal, Tracy McGrady, Kwame Brown, Eddy Curry, Sebastian Telfair and Gerald Green.

Sponsorships 
 1984–1992: Nike
 1993: Converse
 1994–2003: Adidas
 2004–2006: Reebok

Camp MVPs

Notable players 

The players mentioned have at least 1 All-Star selection in the NBA or were lottery picks in the NBA Draft.

Shareef Abdur-Rahim
Cole Aldrich
Carmelo Anthony
Gilbert Arenas
Chauncey Billups
Carlos Boozer
Chris Bosh
Kwame Brown
Kobe Bryant
Marcus Camby
Sam Cassell
Derrick Coleman
Mike Conley
Eddy Curry
Mike Dunleavy Jr.
Jonny Flynn
Randy Foye
Kevin Garnett
Ben Gordon
Eddie Griffin
Penny Hardaway
Tim Hardaway
James Harden
Allan Houston
Dwight Howard
LeBron James
Brandon Jennings
DerMarr Johnson
Joe Johnson
DeAndre Jordan
Christian Laettner
Shaun Livingston
Rashard Lewis
Kevin Love
Stephon Marbury
Kenyon Martin
Jamal Mashburn
O. J. Mayo
Antonio McDyess
Tracy McGrady
Alonzo Mourning
Jameer Nelson
Joakim Noah
Jermaine O'Neal
Shaquille O'Neal
Greg Oden
Lamar Odom
Tony Parker
Paul Pierce
Jason Richardson
Glenn Robinson
Derrick Rose
Stromile Swift
Wally Szczerbiak
Sebastian Telfair
Isaiah Thomas
Tim Thomas
Robert Traylor
Antoine Walker
Gerald Wallace
Chris Webber
Chris Wilcox
Yi Jianlian

References 

Basketball organizations
Basketball in New Jersey
High school basketball in the United States